Roger Craig Zobel is an American filmmaker and actor whose work includes music videos, film, and television. He has directed the films Compliance (2012), Z for Zachariah (2015), and The Hunt (2020). On TV he has directed episodes of The Leftovers, American Gods, and Westworld. In 2021, he directed the miniseries Mare of Easttown on HBO. He also helped to co-create the online Flash animation series Homestar Runner with Mike and Matt Chapman, known collectively as The Brothers Chaps.

Early life
Zobel was born in New York and grew up in Atlanta, Georgia, later studying film at the North Carolina School of the Arts alongside David Gordon Green and other future collaborators. He is of Jewish background.

Career
After graduation, Zobel worked on Green's first three films — George Washington (2000), All the Real Girls, (2003) and Undertow (2003), as either co-producer, production manager or second unit director. He also directed The Hunt (2020).

More recently, he reupped his deal with HBO, which was served for three more years.

Homestar Runner

Homestar Runner is a Flash animated internet cartoon which mixes surreal humor with references to pop culture. Zobel co-created the initial concept and some characters for a book with Mike Chapman using the name "Homestar Runner", coined by their mutual friend James Huggins, which later went on to become the flash animated cartoon by Mike and Matt Chapman. On a day off while Zobel and Chapman were working summer jobs surrounding the 1996 Summer Olympics, a visit to a bookstore prompted them to parody the state of children's books, leading to the creation of the cartoon.

Film career
Zobel has directed, written, and produced several films, including Great World of Sound and Compliance. In August 2019, the release of Zobel's horror thriller film The Hunt was postponed by distributor Universal in response to the 2019 El Paso shooting, with the studio cancelling the film's original September 27, 2019, date, and moving it to March 13, 2020.

Filmography 
Film

Television

References

External links

Official website for Homestar Runner

American film producers
American male screenwriters
Living people
1975 births
Film directors from New York (state)
People from Atlanta
University of North Carolina School of the Arts alumni
Film directors from Georgia (U.S. state)
Screenwriters from Georgia (U.S. state)

Jewish American film producers
Jewish American screenwriters